In the Syriac Orthodox Church a thabilitho is a wooden slab placed at the center of the altar and covered with cloth. During Holy Qurbono (the Eucharist) the paten and chalice are placed over it. It is consecrated with chrism by a bishop during the consecration of a church. Each thabilitho has inscribed on it the following: "The Holy Ghost has hallowed this thabilitho by the hands of Mar..." and the year. The Holy Qurbono can be celebrated anywhere on a thabilitho, and cannot be celebrated without one. The thabilitho symbolizes the Cross on which Jesus was crucified.

Sources

See also
Tabot
Antimension
Altar stone
Corporal (liturgy)

Syriac Orthodox Church
Eucharistic objects